Douglas Mark Rushkoff (born February 18, 1961) is an American media theorist, writer, columnist, lecturer, graphic novelist, and documentarian. He is best known for his association with the early cyberpunk culture and his advocacy of open source solutions to social problems.

Rushkoff is most frequently regarded as a media theorist and is known for coining terms and concepts including viral media (or media virus), digital native, and social currency . He has written ten books on media, technology and culture. He wrote the first syndicated column on cyberculture for The New York Times Syndicate, as well as regular columns for The Guardian of London, Arthur, Discover, and the online magazines Daily Beast, TheFeature.com and meeting industry magazine One+.

Rushkoff is currently Professor of Media Theory and Digital Economics at the City University of New York, Queens College.  He has previously lectured at The New School University in Manhattan and the ITP at New York University's Tisch School of the Arts, where he created the Narrative Lab. He also has taught online for the MaybeLogic Academy. Douglas Rushkoff has been declared the 6th most influential thinker in the world by MIT Technology Review, only behind Steven Pinker, David Graeber, Nobel prize winner Daniel Kahneman, Thilo Sarrazin and Richard Florida.

Biography

Background 

Rushkoff was born in New York City, New York, and is the son of Sheila, a psychiatric social worker, and Marvin Rushkoff, a hospital administrator. He graduated from Princeton University in 1983. He moved to Los Angeles and completed a Master of Fine Arts in Directing from the California Institute of the Arts. Later he took up a post-graduate fellowship from the American Film Institute. He was a PhD candidate at Utrecht University's New Media Program, writing a dissertation on new media literacies, which was approved in June, 2012.

Rushkoff emerged in the early 1990s as an active member of the cyberpunk movement, developing friendships and collaborations with people including Timothy Leary, RU Sirius, Paul Krassner, Robert Anton Wilson, Ralph Abraham, Terence McKenna, Genesis P-Orridge, Ralph Metzner, Grant Morrison, Mark Pesce, Erik Davis, and other writers, artists and philosophers interested in the intersection of technology, society and culture.

Cyberia, his first book on cyberculture, was inspired by the San Francisco rave scene of the early 1990s.  The initially planned publication was scrapped, however; in Rushkoff's words, "in 1992 Bantam canceled the book because they thought by 1993 the internet would be over." It was eventually published in 1994.

As his books became more accepted, and his concepts of the "media virus" and "social contagion" became mainstream ideas, Rushkoff was invited to deliver commentaries on National Public Radio's All Things Considered, and to make documentaries for the PBS series Frontline.

In 2002, Rushkoff was awarded the Marshall McLuhan Award by the Media Ecology Association for his book Coercion, and became a member and sat on the board of directors of that organization. This allied him with the "media ecologists", a continuation of what is known as the Toronto School of media theorists including Marshall McLuhan, Walter Ong, and Neil Postman.

Rushkoff was invited to participate as a consultant ranging to the United Nations Commission on World Culture and the US Department of State.

Simultaneously, Rushkoff continued to develop his relationship with counterculture figures, collaborating with Genesis P-Orridge as a keyboardist for Psychic TV, and credited with composing music for the album Hell Is Invisible... Heaven Is Her/e. Rushkoff taught classes in media theory and in media subversion for New York University's Interactive Telecommunications Program, participated in activist pranks with the Yes Men and eToy, contributed to numerous books and documentaries on psychedelics, and spoke or appeared at many events sponsored by counterculture publisher Disinformation.

Influences 
References to media ecologist and Toronto School of Communication founder Marshall McLuhan appear throughout Rushkoff's work as a focus on media over content, the effects of media on popular culture and the level at which people participate when consuming media.

Rushkoff worked with both Robert Anton Wilson and Timothy Leary on developing philosophical systems to explain consciousness, its interaction with technology, and social evolution of the human species, and references both consistently in his work.
Leary, along with John Barlow and Terence McKenna characterized the mid-1990s as techno-utopian, and saw the rapid acceleration of culture, emerging media and the unchecked advancement of technology as completely positive.
Rushkoff's own unbridled enthusiasm for cyberculture was tempered by the dotcom boom, when the non-profit character of the Internet was rapidly overtaken by corporations and venture capital. Rushkoff often cites two events in particular – the day Netscape became a public company in 1995, and the day AOL bought Time Warner in 2000 – as pivotal moments in his understanding of the forces at work in the evolution of new media.

Rushkoff spent several years exploring Judaism as a primer for media literacy, going so far as to publish a book inviting Jews to restore the religion to its "open source" roots. He founded a movement for progressive Judaism called Reboot, but subsequently left when he felt its funders had become more concerned with marketing and publicity of Judaism than its actual improvement and evolution.
Disillusioned by the failure of the open source model to challenge entrenched and institutional hierarchies from religion to finance, he became a colleague of Mark Crispin Miller and Naomi Klein, appearing with them at Smith College as well as in numerous documentaries decrying the corporatization of public space and consciousness.
He has dedicated himself most recently to the issues of media literacy, participatory government, and the development of local and complementary currencies. He wrote a book and film called Life Inc., which traces the development of corporatism and centralized currency from the Renaissance to today, and hosted a radio show called The Media Squat on WFMU from 2008 to 2009, concerned with reclaiming commerce and culture from corporate domination.

Influence
In late 2020, Rushkoff commented on the release of the documentary The Social Dilemma. This was partly based on the prompting from his fanbase that expressed that the ideas on the film were direct quotations from his books and films. Rushkoff speculated at the possibility that the programmers interviewed in the film have read something from himself, or other writers such as Nicholas Carr, Sherry Turkle, Andrew Keen, Howard Rheingold, Richard Barbrook, Tim Wu, or even the singer Raffi. He acknowledged that while their work and analogies are being quoted without acknowledgement of their source, that these quotations serves as memes themselves and are indicative of their sustaining value beyond their original authors. One of the people in the documentary includes Jaron Lanier, who was a subject in Rushkoff's Cyberia years before. Rushkoff also acknowledged he got a call from the Center for Humane Technology stating that they are starting a new organization called Team Humanity, which is a direct wordplay from Rushkoff's podcast Team Human. Rushkoff asked his fanbase to not act negatively toward this appropriation, and to be inclusive of this new community in order to open up a new dialogue between the groups.

Awards and appointments 
Douglas Rushkoff has served on the board of directors of the Media Ecology Association, The Center for Cognitive Liberty and Ethics, and is a founding member of Technorealism, as well as of the advisory board of The National Association for Media Literacy Education, MeetUp.com and HyperWords

He is the winner of the first Neil Postman Award for Career Achievement in Public Intellectual Activity, given by the Media Ecology Association, in 2004.

Themes

General 
Douglas Rushkoff's philosophy developed from a techno-utopian view of new media to a more nuanced critique of cyberculture discourse and the impact of media on society. Viewing everything except for intention as media, he frequently explores the themes of how to make media interactive, how to help people (especially children) effectively analyze and question the media they consume, as well as how to cultivate intention and agency. He has theorized on such media as religion, culture, politics, and money.

Technology and cyberculture 
Up to the late-1990s, Douglas Rushkoff's philosophy towards technology could be characterized as media-deterministic. Cyberculture and new media were supposed to promote democracy and allow people to transcend the ordinary.

In Cyberia, Rushkoff states the essence of mid-1990s culture as being the fusion of rave psychedelia, chaos theory and early computer networks. The promise of the resulting "counter culture" was that media would change from being passive to active, that we would embrace the social over content, and that empowers the masses to create and react.

This idea also comes up in the concept of the media virus, which Rushkoff details in the 1994 publication of Media Virus: Hidden Agendas in Popular Culture. This significant work adopts organic metaphors to show that media, like viruses, are mobile, easily duplicated and presented as non-threatening. Technologies can make our interaction with media an empowering experience if we learn to decode the capabilities offered to us by our media. Unfortunately, people often stay one step behind our media capabilities. Ideally, emerging media and technologies have the potential to enlighten, to aid grassroots movements, to offer an alternative to the traditional "top-down" media, to connect diverse groups and to promote the sharing of information.

Rushkoff does not limit his writings to the effect of technology on adults, and in Playing the Future turns his attention to the generation of people growing up who understand the language of media like natives, guarded against coercion. These "screenagers", a term originated by Rushkoff, have the chance to mediate the changing landscape more effectively than digital immigrants.

With Coercion (1999), Rushkoff realistically examines the potential benefits and dangers inherent in cyberculture and analyzes market strategies that work to make people act on instinct (and buy!) rather than reflect rationally. The book wants readers to learn to "read" the media they consume and interpret what is really being communicated.

Religion 
In Nothing Sacred: The Truth About Judaism, Rushkoff explores the medium of religion and intellectually deconstructs the Bible and the ways that he says religion fails to provide true connectivity and transformative experiences.

Currency 
Most recently, Douglas Rushkoff has turned his critical lens to the medium of currency. One of the most important concepts that he creates and develops is the notion of social currency, or the degree to which certain content and media can facilitate and/or promote relationships and interactions between members of a community. Rushkoff mentions jokes, scandals, blogs, ambiance, i.e. anything that would engender "water cooler" talk, as social currency.

In his book, Life, Inc. and his dissertation "Monopoly Moneys," Rushkoff takes a look at physical currency and the history of corporatism. Beginning with an overview of how money has been gradually centralized throughout time, and pondering the reasons and consequences of such a fact, he goes on to demonstrate how our society has become defined by and controlled by corporate culture.

Social media 

Rushkoff has long been skeptical of social media. On February 25, 2013, he announced in a CNN op-ed that he was leaving Facebook, citing concerns about the company's use of his personal data.

Wealth and Power 
In his most recent work, Survival of the Richest: Escape Fantasies of the Tech Billionaires (2022), Rushkoff explored the calculus some of the extremely wealthy make in the recognition that their often single-minded pursuit of greater profits and better technology are creating an increasingly unstable world. In a 2022 talk for House of SpeakEasy’s Seriously Entertaining program, Rushkoff explained the billionaires’ mindset as coming down to this essential question: “How much money and technology do I need to insulate myself from the reality I’m creating by earning money and using technology in this way?” He argues that treating people better in the present may be the most surefire way to avoid widespread catastrophe in the future.

Bibliography

Articles 
 "Team Human vs. Team AI," Strategy+Business, February 5, 2019.

Books 
 2022. Survival of the Richest 
 2019. Team Human 
 2016. Throwing Rocks at the Google Bus 
 2013. Present Shock: When Everything Happens Now 
 2010. Program or be Programmed: Ten Commands for a Digital Age Paperback  Ebook 
 2009. Life, Inc.: How the World Became A Corporation and How To Take It Back 
 2009. Foreword: The Opportunity for Renaissance, pp. 273–281, in Be The Media, David Mathison, editor
 2005. Get Back in the Box: Innovation from the Inside Out 
 2003. Open Source Democracy A Demos Essay
 2003. Nothing Sacred: The Truth About Judaism 
 1999. Coercion: Why We Listen to What "They" Say 
 1996. Playing the Future: What We Can Learn From Digital Kids  (Published in the UK in 1997 as "Children of Chaos: Surviving the End of the World as We Know it" )
 1995. Media Virus: Hidden Agendas in Popular Culture 
 1994. The GenX Reader (Editor, contributor) 
 1994. Cyberia: Life in the Trenches of Cyberspace

Book chapters

Fiction works 
 2002. Exit Strategy (aka Bull) 
 1997. Ecstasy Club

Graphic novels
 2016. Aleister and Adolf with Michael Avon Oeming 
 2012. A.D.D. – Adolescent Demo Division 
 2005–2008. Testament 
 2004. Club Zero-G

Documentaries 
 2014. Generation Like. PBS Frontline.
 2008. American Music: OFF THE RECORD Dir. Benjamin Meade, Cosmic Cowboy Studio.
 2009–2010. Digital Nation, Life on the Virtual Frontier. Web site and documentary, PBS Frontline.
 2009. Life Inc. The Movie
 2004. The Persuaders. This Frontline documentary examines the psychological techniques behind popular marketing and advertising trends, determines how these methods influence how we view ourselves and desires, and postulates on the future implications of these persuasive approaches at work.
 2001. Merchants of Cool, a groundbreaking, award-winning Frontline documentary which explores the people, marketing techniques and ideologies behind popular culture for teenagers. This video attempts to answer whether or not teen popular culture is reflective of its population or manufactured by big business and related groups.

Radio 
 The Media Squat (creator and host): freeform, bottom-up, open source WFMU radio which examines similarly open source, bottom-up solutions to some of the problems engendered by our relentlessly top-down society.
 Team Human Podcast (creator and host): a weekly interview show focused on themes of inspecting and subverting technology's effect on human behaviour. The format of the show is typically started with a monologue from Rushkoff and then an interview with a guest.

References

External links
 
 
 
 
 
 

1961 births
Living people
American bloggers
American socialists
Princeton University alumni
California Institute of the Arts alumni
Utrecht University alumni
People from Scarsdale, New York
20th-century American Jews
Mass media theorists
Communication scholars
Open content activists
American radio DJs
Cyberpunk writers
Futurologists
Anti-corporate activists
Critical theorists
Chaos magicians
New York University faculty
Scarsdale High School alumni
Internet theorists
Open-source movement
21st-century American essayists
21st-century American Jews